Gogarty is an Irish surname. Notable people with the surname include:

Daniel Gogarty (born 1996), Canadian soccer player
Deirdre Gogarty (born 1969), Irish boxer
Dermot St. John Gogarty (born 1908), Irish architect
Henry Aloysius Gogarty (1884–1931), Irish bishop
James Gogarty (1890–1921), Irish revolutionary
Oliver St. John Gogarty (1878–1957), Irish poet
Paddy Gogarty, Irish Gaelic footballer
Paul Gogarty (born 1968), Irish politician

See also
Fogarty

Anglicised Irish-language surnames
Surnames of Irish origin